Jimmy Philémond-Montout (born 6 November 1986) is a Canadian-Martiniquais author, investor, film producer, film director and screenwriter.

Selected filmography
Galeriens (2007)
Closed Door (2008)
 Popol- Vuh (2009)
 Our New Wave (2010)

Producer
 In the Shadow (2010)
 Sora no Otoshimono Final: Eternal My Master (2014) 
 Date A Live: The Movie – Mayuri Judgement (2015)
 Let's Go, JETS! (2017)

Actor
 La Horde (2008)

Publications

Novels 
 To Build a Home (2021)
 Ride of the Valkyries (2021)

References

External links
 

1986 births
Living people

French film directors
French screenwriters
French film producers
Martiniquais writers
Caribbean_writers